The Minneapolis Marines were an early professional football team that existed from 1905 until 1924. The team was later resurrected from 1929 to 1930 under the Minneapolis Red Jackets name. The Marines were owned locally by Minneapolitans John Dunn and Val Ness, and composed primarily of working-class teenagers.  Some of the first games were played at Camden Park, The Parade, and Bottineau Field. Later games were played at larger stadiums such as Nicollet Park and Lexington Park. The Minneapolis Marines are the first Minnesota-based team to join the National Football League, predating the Duluth Eskimos (1923) and Minnesota Vikings (1961).

History

Origins
The Marines, formed mostly in 1905, were composed of working-class teenagers that came from the area that is located close to US Bank Stadium at the junction between Cedar and Washington Avenues. The team began play in the 115-pound weight class, and by 1907 had moved up to the 145-pound weight class. The team's 1907 roster consisted of future professional stars Walt Buland, Sheepy Redeen, Dutch Gaustad and its star player Rube Ursella. In 1909 future boxer, Labe Safro, joined the team as a fullback. These players represented the core of the team until 1919. The Marines would only have players on the team with no high school or college playing experience until 1913.

During the 1910s, the Minneapolis Marines became known as one of the best and dominant "independent" teams in the upper Midwest region. It is thought that the Minneapolis Marines defensive line, headed by Buland and Gaustad, brought the Marines most of their wins.

Hiring ex-college players
Between 1910 and 1914, the year's biggest football game in Minneapolis independent football was between the Minneapolis Beavers and the Minneapolis Marines. In contrast to the Marines, most of the Beaver players had college experience playing at the University of St. Thomas. The Marines defeated the Beavers in 1910 to win the city title. However, in 1911 and 1912, the Beavers pulled off upsets against the Marines. This led to the team hiring an outside coach, Ossie Solem. He would stay with the team through the 1915 season. During his time with the Marines, Solem introduced the team to the single-wing formation, developed by the famed coach Pop Warner and used by the University of Minnesota at the time. In 1913 and 1914, the Marines defeated the Beavers to reclaim the Minneapolis city championship. The Beavers disbanded after the 1914 season.

By 1916 the Marines added several other ex-college players to their lineup. The most notable was Bobby Marshall, who was the first African-American player at the University of Minnesota, having played there from 1903 until 1906.  By 1916 Marshall was one of the best semi-pro players in the Twin Cities area. Dewey Lyle and Fred Chicken, who would later become a pro star in the NFL, were also picked up around that time. Many players that made the Marines squad had previously played for big college teams such as the University of Minnesota, Hamline University, Augsburg University, Macalester College, and Carleton College.

Peak of the team
The Marines initially won many of their games as they were participating in a semi-pro league. Dunn, who served the team as a player and manager, was extremely happy with the Marines' initial performance and he wanted to move his team into the professional leagues. Dunn moved the Marines away from the teams they had already beaten and into the new Nicollet Park, which was also the home of the Minneapolis Millers baseball team, and was larger than the team's previous fields. Dunn scheduled games against out of town teams and the Marines went on to have a substantial winning streak of 34 games in a row.

However, with the team's former rivals, the Beavers, out of the picture, the Marines had no strong local opposition. This led Dunn to schedule an annual Thanksgiving game against a team of ex-Gophers all-stars from the University of Minnesota. From 1913 until 1917, while the Marines posted a 34–0 regular season record, the team was 0–2–1 against the Gophers All-Stars.

The NFL and first closure
Independent football shut down completely in 1918, due to a combination of the flu pandemic and World War I. When the Marines were finally able to play again, in 1919, they lost several of their key players who moved to the Rock Island Independents. With their core players (Marshall, Ursella, Buland, Lyle, and Chicken) gone, the Marines were unable to regain their pre-war form, causing attendance to decline after 1919.

Dunn tried to find a way to keep the team solvent. On August 27, 1921, the Minneapolis Marines joined the American Professional Football Association (later renamed the National Football League in 1922). Dunn hoped that if the Marines were playing professional football, there would be more fans and more money generated. The Marines posted a 4–11–2 record against NFL teams from 1921 until 1923. After posting an 0–6 record in 1924, Dunn folded the team.

The Red Jackets and second closure
Dunn and Val Ness attempted to resurrect their franchise in 1929 with a new version of the Marines. The pair decided to try one more time to produce an effective professional football team, as they became the new owners of the Minneapolis Red Jackets. The team was named for their red jerseys with red and white striped sleeves, like that which the Marines had worn years earlier. The team posted a dismal 1–9 record in 1929. The Red Jackets finished in the "red" financially, but not far from breaking even, primarily because they played three games with the Chicago Bears that season. In 1930, they planned to play their four home games in October in Minneapolis' Nicollet Park. The franchise hoped for good weather, thus stimulating better attendance. However, it rained on each scheduled date and the team went broke. After a 1–7–1 start in 1930, the Red Jackets merged into the NFL's Frankford Yellow Jackets by selling Frankford ten of their players, and then went out of existence. Three other players were sold to the Green Bay Packers. Minneapolis would not hold another NFL franchise for the next three decades, before the Vikings debuted in 1961 (Haugsrud would own a 10% share of that franchise).

First pro football training camp
The Minneapolis Marines are especially known for their lack of prior football experience and their outstanding ability to still remain one of the best "independent" teams in the upper midwest regions. They worked hard and did everything they could to gain an edge over the competition and be at the top of their game. They would hold pre-season training camps in order to get in shape and hone their skills, one of which was called Clef Camp located near Lake Pokegama in Grand Rapids, Minnesota.

Season-by-season (pre-NFL)

Season-by-season (NFL seasons only)

References

PFRA's article on Minneapolis Marines (broken link)

 
1905 establishments in Minnesota